Actenonyx is a genus of beetles in the family Carabidae. At present only species in this genus is Actenonyx bembidioides. However it has been suggested that a taxonomic revision of this genus is needed as there are two species that await description. This genus and species was first described by Adam White and is endemic to New Zealand.

References

Lebiinae
Monotypic Carabidae genera
Endemic fauna of New Zealand
Beetles described in 1846
Beetles of New Zealand
Endemic insects of New Zealand